Peter Bentiu Daniel Chol (born 23 October 1994) is a South Sudanese footballer who plays as a midfielder for Premier League club Kator FC and the South Sudan national team.

International career
Chol capped for South Sudan at senior level during the 2019 Africa Cup of Nations qualification Group C.

International goals

References

1994 births
Living people
South Sudanese footballers
Association football midfielders
South Sudan international footballers